John Woo (born 1946) is a Chinese film director and producer.

John Woo is also the name of:
John Woo (musician), with the rock band The Magnetic Fields
Johnny Woo (comics), a Judge Dredd comic character

See also
John Wu (disambiguation)